Ruotsalainen is a Finnish surname (literally meaning "a Swede", but as a name originally referring to the adherents of Lutheran Christianity in Karelia). It may refer to:

People
Arttu Ruotsalainen (born 1997), ice hockey forward
Gabriel Ruotsalainen (1893–1984), long-distance runner
Paavo Ruotsalainen (1777–1852), farmer and lay preacher

Pirjo Ruotsalainen, orienteering competitor
Reijo Ruotsalainen (born 1960), ice hockey defenceman
Satu Ruotsalainen (born 1966 ), heptathlete
Veikko Ruotsalainen (1908–1986), skier

Places
Ruotsalainen (lake)

Finnish-language surnames
Surnames of Finnish origin